Esfahan Steel Company (Sherkaté Zob âhané Esfahan), formerly known as Esfahan Aryamehr Steel Company prior to 1979 Revolution, opened in late 1960s, based close to the cities of Fooladshahr and Zarrinshahr, Esfahan Province. It is Iran's third largest steel producer and is directly controlled by the Ministry of Industries & Mines.

The company owns Zob Ahan Esfahan, a professional football club that competes in the Persian Gulf Pro League.

See also
Mining in Iran
Mobarakeh Steel Company

References

External links
Official website 

Steel companies of Iran
Isfahan Province
Iranian brands
Iranian entities subject to the U.S. Department of the Treasury sanctions

Iran–Soviet Union relations